Juanin Clay (born Juanin Clay de Zalduondo; November 26, 1949 – March 12, 1995) was an American actress whose films included WarGames and The Legend of the Lone Ranger.

Career
Clay was a contender for the role of Wilma Deering in Buck Rogers in the 25th Century, but lost the role when Erin Gray returned to reprise her role from the theatrical release. Clay later guest-starred in the Buck Rogers episode "Vegas in Space", playing Marla Landers, who briefly partnered with Rogers. Clay appeared as a guest star on a number of TV series, including Father Murphy, L.A. Law, and The Edge of Night (she originated the role of Raven Alexander in 1976, before Sharon Gabet took over the role). Clay was also married to actor Joe Lambie, who played Logan Swift, one of the husbands of her character on The Edge of Night. In 1981, she appeared in The Legend of the Lone Ranger, and in 1983, she had a small role in WarGames. In 1985, she played Jacqueline Kennedy in the miniseries Robert Kennedy and His Times. She was a founding member of the New York Acting Unit, a Shakespearean repertory group, and the co-author, producer, and director of King of the City, a drama about Al Capone.

Education
Clay attended the Ethel Walker School in Simsbury, Connecticut. She graduated from Smith College, then earned a master's degree in education from Harvard University.

Death
Clay died on March 12, 1995, "after a lengthy illness".

Legacy
The Valley Theatre League of Los Angeles created the Juanin Clay Lifetime Achievement Award in her memory.

Filmography

References

External links
 Juanin Clay, the woman who would have been Wilma – tribute site

1949 births
1995 deaths
Actresses from Los Angeles
American film actresses
American television actresses
Harvard Graduate School of Education alumni
Smith College alumni
20th-century American actresses